Henrik Lundberg (born 21 August 1991) is a Swedish professional ice hockey player. He played with Skellefteå AIK in the Elitserien during the 2010–11 Elitserien season.

References

External links

1991 births
Living people
Skellefteå AIK players
Swedish ice hockey right wingers